Economic war may refer to

Economic warfare economic policies and measures of which the primary effect is to weaken the economy of the enemy.
War economy, the economy of a country during wartime.
The Anglo-Irish Trade War
An set of policies in Uganda under Idi Amin, including the expropriation of properties owned by Asians and Europeans.
The 2019–2020 Japan–South Korea trade dispute, also known as "Economic war" by many media in South Korea and Japan.